The 1994 Ukrainian Cup Final is a football match that took place at the Republican Stadium on May 29, 1994. The match was the 3rd Ukrainian Cup Final and it was contested by FC Chornomorets Odesa and SC Tavriya Simferopol. The 1994 Ukrainian Cup Final was the third to be held in the Ukrainian capital Kyiv. Chornomorets won on penalty kicks 5:3 after the score was tied 0:0.

Remarkably, no yellow cards were issued at this game.

Road to Kyiv 

Both teams started from the first round of the competition (1/16). Unlike Chornomorets who met almost no resistance up to the final, defeating Dnipro at its home ground 3:0 along the way; Tavriya had a little bit of trouble when it traveled to Western parts of Ukraine. The Crimeans almost yielded to Skala Stryi in the first round of the competition pulling an extra-time win in Simferopol. Tavriya also managed to defeat Veres followed, surprisingly, by knocking Dynamo out of the competition. The most effort the Odesans needed was against the Carpathian Lions managing to pull a home win in the last minutes of playing time while being tied at one all.

Match details

Match statistics

See also
 Ukrainian Cup 1993-94

References

External links 
 Calendar of Matches - Schedule of the 1994 Ukrainian Cup on the Ukrainian Soccer History web-site (ukrsoccerhistory.com). 

Cup Final
Ukrainian Cup finals
Ukrainian Cup Final 1994
Ukrainian Cup Final 1994
Ukrainian Cup Final 1994
Ukrainian Cup Final 1994